Ferhat Erdoğan (born 18 June 2001) is a Turkish professional footballer who plays as a midfielder for an amateur side Develi Spor.

Professional career
Yıldırım is a youth product of Sarayköy 1926, Denizlispor, Altınordu, and Çal Belediyespor. He signed his first professional contract with Denizlispor on 26 January 2021. He made his professional debut with Denizlispor in a 5–1 Süper Lig loss to Fatih Karagümrük on 15 March 2021.

References

External links
 
 

2001 births
Sportspeople from Denizli
Living people
Turkish footballers
Association football midfielders
Denizlispor footballers
Süper Lig players
TFF First League players